The first English Fell Running Championships were held in the 1986 season, based on results in various fell races of different lengths over the year.

The winners have been as follows.

All Jeska's athletics results were declared null and void when she failed to produce samples of her testosterone levels.

References

Fell running competitions